Hair Cuttery is an American unisex hair salon chain and the largest privately held hairdressing chain in the United States.

History
Hair Cuttery was founded in 1974, when the first salon was opened in West Springfield, Virginia. Since the 1970s, the company expanded to become the largest privately held salon chain in the United States. As of 2021, it has more than 500 salons along the East Coast and the Midwest.

In April 2020, the chain was acquired by debtor in possession Hair Cuttery Salon Holdings Inc, an affiliate of Tacit Salon Holdings LLC, led by CEO Seth Gittlitz. Hair Cuttery Salon Holdings also financed the chain's operating expenses and restored employee pay for the period preceding the acquisition, when the chain's operations were suspended due to the COVID-19 pandemic.

Operations
The Hair Cuttery Family of Brands operates Hair Cuttery, Bubbles, and Cibu chains of salons. Hair Cuttery operates over 500 salons and employs more than 5000 stylists.

References

External links

Hairdressing salon chains
American companies established in 1974
Retail companies established in 1974
Retail companies of the United States
1974 establishments in Virginia
Companies that filed for Chapter 11 bankruptcy in 2020